This is a list of turnpikes built and operated by private companies or non-profit turnpike trusts in the U.S. state of Connecticut, mainly in the 19th century. While most of the roads are still maintained as free public roads, some have been abandoned.


List

Map

References
Frederic James Wood, The Turnpikes of New England and Evolution of the Same Through England, Virginia, and Maryland, 1919
Moses Warren, Connecticut, from actual survey, 1813
William Lester, Map of New London and Windham counties in Conn., 1833
John C. Pease and John M. Niles, A Gazetteer of the States of Connecticut and Rhode-Island, 1819

Turnpikes
Connecticut
Turnpikes
Turnpikes